Joseph William Kittinger II (July 27, 1928 – December 9, 2022) was an officer in the United States Air Force (USAF) who served from 1950 to 1978, and earned Command Pilot status before retiring with the rank of colonel. He held the world record for the highest skydive—102,800 feet (31.3 km)—from 1960 until 2012.

He participated in the Project Manhigh and Project Excelsior high-altitude balloon flight projects from 1956 to 1960 and was the first man to fully witness the curvature of the Earth. 

A fighter pilot during the Vietnam War, Kittinger shot down a North Vietnamese MiG-21 jet fighter. He was later shot down as well, subsequently spending 11 months as a prisoner of war in a North Vietnamese prison before he was repatriated in 1973.

In 1984, he became the first person to make a solo crossing of the Atlantic Ocean in a gas balloon.

In 2012, Kittinger participated in the Red Bull Stratos project as capsule communicator at age 84, directing Felix Baumgartner on his  freefall from Earth's stratosphere, which broke Kittinger's own 53-year-old record. Baumgartner's record would be broken two years later by Alan Eustace.

Early life and military career
Born in Tampa, Florida, and raised in Orlando, Florida, Kittinger was educated at The Bolles School in Jacksonville, Florida, and the University of Florida. He became fascinated with planes at a young age and soloed in a Piper Cub by the time he was 17. After racing speedboats as a teenager, he entered the U.S. Air Force as an aviation cadet in March 1949. On completion of aviation cadet training in March 1950, he received his pilot wings and a commission as a second lieutenant. He was subsequently assigned to the 86th Fighter-Bomber Wing based at Ramstein Air Base in West Germany, flying the F-84 Thunderjet and F-86 Sabre.

In 1954, Kittinger was transferred to the Air Force Missile Development Center (AFMDC) at Holloman AFB, New Mexico. Kittinger was impressed by Stapp's dedication and leadership as a pioneer in aerospace medicine. Stapp, in turn, was impressed with Kittinger's skillful jet piloting, later recommending him for space-related aviation research work.

Project Excelsior

Captain Kittinger was next assigned to the Aerospace Medical Research Laboratories at Wright-Patterson AFB in Dayton, Ohio. For Project Excelsior (meaning "ever upward"), a name given to the project by Colonel Stapp as part of research into high-altitude bailouts, he made a series of three extreme altitude parachute jumps from an open gondola carried aloft by large helium balloons. These jumps were made in a "rocking-chair" position, descending on his back, rather than in the usual face-down position familiar to skydivers. This was because he was wearing a  "kit" on his behind, and his pressure suit naturally formed a sitting shape when it was inflated, a shape appropriate for sitting in an airplane cockpit.

The automatic parachute opener in his equipment saved his life. He went into a flat spin at a rotational velocity of about 120 rpm, the g-forces at his extremities having been calculated to be over 22 times the force of gravity, setting another record.

For this leap, he was awarded the A. Leo Stevens Parachute Medal.

Incurring yet another equipment malfunction, the pressurization for his right glove malfunctioned during the ascent and his right hand swelled to twice its normal size, but he rode the balloon up to 102,800 feet before stepping off.
 Of the jumps from Excelsior, Kittinger said:
There's no way you can visualize the speed. There's nothing you can see to see how fast you're going. You have no depth perception. If you're in a car driving down the road and you close your eyes, you have no idea what your speed is. It's the same thing if you're free falling from space. There are no signposts. You know you are going very fast, but you don't feel it. You don't have a 614-mph wind blowing on you. I could only hear myself breathing in the helmet.

Kittinger set historical numbers for highest balloon ascent, highest parachute jump, longest-duration drogue-fall (four minutes), and fastest speed by a human being through the atmosphere. These were the USAF records, but were not submitted for aerospace world records to the Fédération Aéronautique Internationale (FAI). Kittinger's record for the highest ascent was broken in 1961 by Malcolm Ross and Victor Prather. His records for highest parachute jump and fastest velocity stood for 52 years, until they were broken in 2012 by Felix Baumgartner.

For this series of jumps, Kittinger was profiled in Life magazine and the National Geographic Magazine, decorated with a second Distinguished Flying Cross, and awarded the Harmon Trophy by President Dwight D. Eisenhower.

Kittinger appeared as himself on the January 7, 1963 episode of the game show To Tell the Truth. He received two votes.

Project Stargazer
Back at Holloman Air Force Base, Kittinger took part in Project Stargazer on December 13–14, 1962.

Later USAF career
In 1965, after returning to the operational Air Force, Kittinger was approached by civilian amateur parachutist Nick Piantanida for assistance on Piantanida's Strato Jump project, an effort to break the previous freefall records of both Kittinger and Soviet Air Force officer Yevgeni Andreyev. Kittinger refused to participate in the effort, believing Piantanida's approach to the project was too reckless. Piantanida died in 1966 as the result of a mishap suffered during his Strato Jump III attempt.

Kittinger later served three combat tours of duty during the Vietnam War, flying a total of 483 combat missions. During his first two tours he flew as an aircraft commander in Douglas A-26 Invaders and modified On Mark Engineering B-26K Counter-Invaders as part of Operations Farm Gate and Big Eagle.

Following his first two Vietnam tours, he returned to the United States and soon transitioned to the McDonnell Douglas F-4 Phantom II. During a voluntary third tour of duty to Vietnam in 1971–72, he commanded the 555th Tactical Fighter Squadron (555 TFS), the noted "Triple Nickel" squadron, flying the F-4D Phantom II. During this period he was credited with shooting down a North Vietnamese MiG-21 while flying an F-4D, USAF Serial No. 66-7463, with his WSO, 1st Lieutenant Leigh Hodgdon.

Kittinger was shot down on May 11, 1972, just before the end of his third tour of duty. Kittinger and his wingman were chasing a MiG-21 when Kittinger's F-4 was hit by an air-to-air missile from another MiG-21 that damaged the plane's starboard wing and set the aircraft on fire. Kittinger and Reich ejected a few miles from Thai Nguyen and were soon captured and taken to the city of Hanoi. During the same engagement, Kittinger's wingman, Captain S. E. Nichols, shot down the MiG-21 they had been chasing.

Kittinger and Reich spent 11 months as prisoners of war (POWs) in the Hỏa Lò Prison, the so-called "Hanoi Hilton". Kittinger was put through rope torture soon after his arrival at the POW compound and this made a lasting impression on him. Kittinger was the senior ranking officer (SRO) among the newer prisoners of war, i.e., those captured after 1969. In Kittinger's autobiography "Come Up and Get Me" (by Kittinger and Craig Ryan), Kittinger emphasized being very serious about maintaining the military structure he considered essential to survival. Kittinger and Reich were returned to American hands during Operation Homecoming on March 28, 1973, and they continued their Air Force careers, with Kittinger having been promoted to full colonel while in captivity. Following his return, Colonel Kittinger attended the Air War College at Maxwell AFB, Alabama.

Following completion of the Air War College, Kittinger became the vice commander of the 48th Tactical Fighter Wing at RAF Lakenheath, United Kingdom, where he again flew the F-4 Phantom II. In 1977, he transferred to Headquarters, 12th Air Force, at Bergstrom AFB, Texas, retiring from the U.S. Air Force in 1978.

Kittinger accumulated 7,679 flying hours in the U.S. Air Force, including 948 combat flying hours during three tours during the Vietnam War. In addition, he has flown over 9,100 hours in various civilian aircraft.

Military awards and decorations
Kittinger received the following awards and decorations during his USAF career:

Later civilian career
Kittinger retired from the air force as a colonel in 1978 and initially went to work for Martin Marietta (now Lockheed Martin) Corporation in Orlando, Florida. He later became vice president of flight operations for Rosie O'Grady's Flying Circus, part of the Rosie O'Grady's/Church Street Station entertainment complex in Orlando, prior to the parent company's dissolution.

The record has since been broken. In 1984, he completed the first solo balloon crossing of the Atlantic in the  Balloon of Peace, launched from Caribou, Maine, on September 14 and landing on September 18. The flight was organized by the Canadian promoter Gaetan Croteau. An official FAI world aerospace record, the  flight is the longest gas balloon flight in the AA-10 size category. For the second time in his life, he was the subject of a story in National Geographic Magazine.

Kittinger participated in the Gordon Bennett Cup in ballooning in 1989 (ranked third) and 1994 (ranked 12th).

In the early 1990s, Kittinger helped NASA plan Charles "Nish" Bruce's project to break Kittinger's highest parachute jump record. The project was suspended in 1994.

The project collected leading experts in the fields of aeronautics, medicine, and engineering to ensure its success. Kittinger served as CAPCOM (capsule communicator) for Baumgartner's jump, which broke Kittinger's altitude record set during Project Excelsior.

In 2013, Kittinger helped balloonist Jonathan Trappe as he attempted to be the first to cross the Atlantic by cluster balloon.

Legacy
 
In 1997, Kittinger was inducted into the National Aviation Hall of Fame in Dayton, Ohio.

On January 23, 2007, the Civil Air Patrol honored Kittinger by renaming the Texas CAP wing's TX-352 Squadron after him. Texas Governor Rick Perry cited Kittinger's work, as did the Texas state senate with a special resolution presented during the dedication ceremony attended by Kittinger and his wife, Sherry. The Colonel Joseph W. Kittinger Phantom Senior Squadron of CAP's Texas Wing is based at the former Bergstrom AFB, the site of Kittinger's last active duty assignment in the Air Force and which is now the Austin-Bergstrom International Airport.

In Season Two, Episode 10 of British teen drama Skins, Kittinger is mentioned by Jal in her speech at Chris' funeral, saying "Captain Joe ascended 32 kilometres into the stratosphere. And then, armed only with a parachute, he jumped out. [...] It had never been done before, and it's never been done since. He did it just because he could. And that's why Chris loved him."

Kittinger was honored at a 2009 ceremony in Caribou, Maine, the launch point for his 1984 solo trans-Atlantic balloon flight. He also served as the guest of honor at the community's sesquicentennial celebration.

On February 20, 2013, Kittinger visited his alma mater, the University of Florida, and spoke to over 400 students and faculty about his role in the Red Bull Stratos and Excelsior III. The event took place during the UF Engineers Week, and it was made possible due to the efforts of the UF American Institute of Aeronautics and Astronautics, UF's Air Force ROTC Detachment 150, and the UF College of Engineering.

Colonel Joe Kittinger Park

In September 1992, Colonel Joe Kittinger Park in Orlando, Florida, was completed by the Greater Orlando Aviation Authority (GOAA) for the City of Orlando. Located on the southwest corner of the Orlando Executive Airport, at the corner of Crystal Lake Drive and South Street, the park was named in Kittinger's honor, but was temporarily closed and partially demolished circa 2008–2011 in order to create a stormwater runoff retention area to permit a highway expansion project of the State Road 408 East-West Expressway. In March 2011, the park was reopened at its previous location.

In spring 2014, the mayor of Orange County, the mayor of Orlando, the GOAA Board, and other City of Orlando and GOAA officials approved the installation in the park of a restored USAF F-4 Phantom II aircraft. The National Museum of the U.S. Air Force picked an F-4D previously on display in Corsicana, Texas (Air Force serial no. 65-0747) to be moved to Orlando for display. It was subsequently determined that Kittinger had flown this particular F-4D on several occasions when it was assigned to his fighter wing in Thailand during the Vietnam War, and later when it was assigned to his fighter wing in Great Britain. Disassembled in Texas and transported in two semi-trailers over several days, the aircraft arrived in Orlando on July 22, 2014. The restored aircraft was mounted on its pylon and formally dedicated on December 14, 2014.

Personal life and death
Kittinger died at the age of 94 on December 9, 2022, from lung cancer. He has been interred at Arlington National Cemetery.

See also
Parachuting

References

Further reading
 (Kittinger's autobiography)

External links

Interview: Joseph Kittinger American Experience
Feb 27 2016 Interview:Joseph Kittenger NPR

1928 births
2022 deaths 
Deaths from lung cancer in Florida
American balloonists
United States Air Force personnel of the Vietnam War
American motorboat racers
American skydivers
American torture victims
Aviators from Florida
National Aviation Hall of Fame inductees
People from Orlando, Florida
People from Tampa, Florida
Martin Marietta people
Military personnel from Florida
Recipients of the Air Medal
Recipients of the Distinguished Flying Cross (United States)
Recipients of the Legion of Merit
Recipients of the Silver Star
Shot-down aviators
Space diving
United States Air Force colonels
University of Florida alumni
Vietnam War prisoners of war
Flight altitude record holders
Bolles School alumni
Balloon flight record holders
American aviation record holders
Air War College alumni
Burials at Arlington National Cemetery